Leonardo Sepúlveda (born June 18, 2001) is a professional soccer player who plays as a left-back for Segunda División RFEF club Granada B. Born in the United States, he has previously represented the Mexico national under-21 team.

Club career
Sepulveda played for the LA Galaxy youth academy at the under-16 and under-18 levels. He also appeared four times for LA Galaxy II in USL in 2017.

On August 16, 2019, Sepulveda joined Spanish club Salamanca UDS. On July 21, 2021, he moved to Granada, being assigned to the reserve team in Segunda División RFEF.

International career
Sepúlveda has represented both the United States and Mexico at the youth level. 

Sepulveda is capped by the United States at the under-16, under-18, and under-20 levels.

Personal
Born in the United States, Sepúlveda is of Mexican descent.

References

Living people
2001 births
Sportspeople from Corona, California
Association football defenders
Soccer players from California
United States men's youth international soccer players
American soccer players
American sportspeople of Mexican descent
American expatriate soccer players
LA Galaxy II players
USL Championship players
Segunda División B players
Tercera División players
Salamanca CF UDS players
Club Recreativo Granada players
American expatriate sportspeople in Spain
Expatriate footballers in Spain